Marion Wetherill Walton aka Marion Walton Putnam (November 19, 1899 – December 11, 1996 ) was an American sculptor and teacher born in New Rochelle, New York.

Early life and education 
She was the daughter of Ernest Forster Walton and music patron  Blanche Wetherill Walton, her father was killed in a Grand Central Station train accident in 1901 and she was raised by her mother.

She studied at the Art Students League, at Hunter College and in Paris with Antoine Bourdelle, at the Borglum School of Sculpture and at Bryn Mawr College.

Career 
Walton was a member of the Sculptors Guild and was one of 250 sculptors who exhibited in the 3rd Sculpture International held at the Philadelphia Museum of Art in the summer of 1949.  She taught both at her studio in New York City and at Sarah Lawrence College.

Walton was a WPA Federal Art Project artist, for whom she created three 1942 limestone relief pieces, ''Indian," "Mine Elevator" and "Campbell's Ledge" for the post office in Pittston, Pennsylvania.

Personal life and family 
Walton's husband, James Putnam (19 Jun 1893 - 3 Feb 1966) whom she married in 1926, worked for the publishing house, the MacMillan Company.  They had one child, Christopher and later were divorced.

The late 1920s found Walton's mother Blanche Walton very involved in the New York music scene, at one point housing composer Béla Bartók during an American tour.  Her apartment also  hosted the first meeting of the American Musicological Society, a meeting that included Joseph Schillinger, Charles Seeger, and Joseph Yasser.  She was also an early supporter of the American composer Henry Cowell and Aaron Copland

Work
 University of Nebraska-Lincoln, Sheldon Museum of Art and Sculpture Garden, Lincoln, Nebraska
 USPO, Pittston, Pennsylvania, limestone panels

References

1899 births
1996 deaths
American women sculptors
20th-century American sculptors
Modern sculptors
Federal Art Project artists
Artists from New York City
Works Progress Administration workers
20th-century American women artists
Sculptors from New York (state)